The Vidourle (Vidorle in occitan) is a  river in southern France that flows into the Mediterranean Sea in Le Grau-du-Roi. Its source is in the Cévennes mountains, northwest of Saint-Hippolyte-du-Fort, at Saint-Roman-de-Codières. It flows generally southeast. At Gallargues-le-Montueux, it was crossed by the old Roman road Via Domitia with the now ruined Roman bridge Pont Ambroix.

The Vidourle flows through the following departments and towns:

 Gard: Saint-Roman-de-Codières, Saint-Hippolyte-du-Fort, Sauve, Quissac, Sommières
 Hérault: Lunel, Marsillargues
 Gard: Saint-Laurent-d'Aigouze, Le Grau-du-Roi

References

Rivers of France
Rivers of Occitania (administrative region)
Rivers of Gard
Rivers of Hérault
0Vidourle